Mordellistena carinthiaca is a beetle in the genus Mordellistena of the family Mordellidae. It was described in 1966 by Ermisch.

References

carinthiaca
Beetles described in 1966